Guangyun Subdistrict  is a subdistrict situated in Wucheng County, Shandong, China. , it administers the following six residential neighborhoods and 32 villages:
Neighborhoods
Zhendong
Beizhou
Zhangnan
Xingwu
Xinglong
Zhenhua

Villages
Jiwei Village
Shaxi Village
Shadong Village
Shazhong Village
Qianwanglitun Village
Zhaozhuang Village
Linzhuang Village
Beiguan Village
Xiguan Village
Dongguan Village
Nanguan Village
Zhangzhuang Village
Xiliuzhuang Village
Liangzhuang Village
Quzhuang Village
Qianzhuang Village
Jiangguantun Village
Guoli Village
Huanghuayuan Village
Renhegou Village
Sunhegou Village
Houwanglitun Village
Gaozhuang Village
Zhuzhuang Village
Lin'erzhuang Village
Wangqianpo Village
Junzhuang Village
Shengzhai Village
Dongqianpo Village
Duqianpo Village
Zhaoqianpo Village
Dongliuzhuang Village

See also
List of township-level divisions of Shandong

References

Township-level divisions of Shandong
Wucheng County